The SK Gas Cup is a Go competition.

Outline
The SK Gas Cup is sponsored by SK Gas. The participants must be under the age of 25 and under the rank of 5 dan. The komi is 6.5 points. Thinking time is 3 hours. The winner's prize is 10,000,000 Won ($8,500).

Past winners

Go competitions in South Korea
SK Sports